Lebedyansky Uyezd (Лебедянский уезд) was one of the subdivisions of the Tambov Governorate of the Russian Empire. It was situated in the western part of the governorate. Its administrative centre was Lebedyan.

Demographics
At the time of the Russian Empire Census of 1897, Lebedyansky Uyezd had a population of 144,822. Of these, 99.9% spoke Russian as their native language.

References

 
Uyezds of Tambov Governorate
Tambov Governorate